Dalaca patriciae is a species of moth of the family Hepialidae. It is known from Argentina.

References

External links
Hepialidae genera

Moths described in 1983
Hepialidae
Moths of South America